1st Multi-member Constituency - Blagoevgrad is a constituency whose borders are the same as Blagoevgrad Province.

Background

In the 2009 Bulgarian parliamentary election, 1st MMC – Blagoevgrad elected 10 members in the Bulgarian National Assembly, 9 of which were through proportionality vote and 1 was through first-past-the-post voting.

Members

2009

Elections
2009 election

 proportionality vote

 first-past-the-post voting

See also
2009 Bulgarian parliamentary election
Politics of Bulgaria
List of Bulgarian Constituencies

References

Electoral divisions in Bulgaria
Blagoevgrad Province